A forward operating base (FOB) is any secured forward operational level military position, commonly a military base, that is used to support strategic goals and tactical objectives. A FOB may or may not contain an airfield, hospital, machine shop, or other logistical facilities. The base may be used for an extended period of time. FOBs are traditionally supported by main operating bases that are required to provide backup support to them. A FOB also improves reaction time to local areas as opposed to having all troops on the main operating base.

Description
In its most basic form, a FOB consists of a ring of barbed wire around a position with a fortified entry control point, or ECP. More advanced FOBs include an assembly of berms, concrete barriers, gates, guard towers, pillboxes and bunkers and other force protection infrastructure. They are often built from Hesco bastions. FOBs will also have an Entry Control Point (ECP). An ECP is a controlled entry and exit point of the FOB and will typically have positions to protect personnel against Personnel Borne Improvised Explosive Devices (PBIED) and Vehicle Borne Improvised Explosive Devices (VBIED), along with blast mitigation with standoff protection.

Bases in Iraq

FOB Abu Ghraib
FOB Al Asad
FOB Caldwell
FOB Carpenter
FOB Courage
FOB Danger
FOB Falcon
FOB Echo
FOB Grizzly
FOB Iskandariyah
FOB Kalsu
FOB Loyalty
FOB Marez
FOB MacKenzie
FOB Q-West
FOB Speicher
FOB Haditha Dam

Bases in Afghanistan

FOBs in the United States

Other reported Coalition installations in Afghanistan 2001–2016

See also

 Advance airfield
 Advanced Landing Ground
 Fire support base
 Forward Operating Site
 Loss of Strength Gradient
 Main Operating Base

References

External links

Military installations of the United States